The Hitia'a Hydroelectric Power Station, also called Faatautia Hydroelectric Power Station, is located near the commune of Hitia'a on the island Tahiti in the overseas country of France, French Polynesia. It has an installed capacity of 7.54 MW and was constructed between 1983 and 1988. The hydroelectric power station is owned by Electricite de Tahiti SA.

It uses water provided by three reservoirs high up in the Faatautia Valley, above the commune. Each reservoir is created by an embankment dam. The power station contains an array of six Pelton turbine-generators which include a 300 kW, 140 kW, 100 kW, 1 MW and two 3 MW units.

See also

Papenoo Hydroelectric Power Station

References

Dams in French Polynesia
Dams completed in 1988
Hydroelectric power stations in France
Energy infrastructure completed in 1988
Power stations in French Polynesia